The Bass Building is a historic building located at 119 St. Patrick in Tonopah, Nevada. Built in 1904, the building is the third oldest stone commercial building in Tonopah. The building has a simple stone design reflective of a transitional period between rustic and well-crafted stone buildings. A. A. Bass built the structure as a lodging house; it later served as offices for a telephone company and as a fraternal lodge. A 1912 fire gutted the building's interior, but Bass rebuilt it the following year.

The building was added to the National Register of Historic Places on May 20, 1982.

References

Tonopah, Nevada
Buildings and structures in Nye County, Nevada
Commercial buildings completed in 1904
Commercial buildings on the National Register of Historic Places in Nevada
National Register of Historic Places in Tonopah, Nevada
1904 establishments in Nevada